Uisgnabhal Mor (729 m) is a mountain in Harris, in the Outer Hebrides of Scotland.

A complex mountain of several ridges and summits, it lies in the centre of the mountains of Harris, and offers fine views from its summit.

References

Mountains and hills of the Outer Hebrides
Marilyns of Scotland
Grahams
Landforms of the Outer Hebrides
Harris, Outer Hebrides